Lanmadaw Township (MLCTS=lam: ma. taw mrui. nai) is located in the western part of downtown Yangon, and shares borders with Ahlon Township in the west, Latha Township in the east, Seikkan Township and Yangon River in the south, and Dagon Township in the north. It consists of twelve wards and is home to five primary schools, two middle schools and two high schools. Lanmadaw and Latha townships make up the Yangon Chinatown.

Lanmadaw Township is home to Yangon Institute of Nursing, University of Medicine 1, Yangon, and Thayettaw, a monastic complex that houses over 60 urban Buddhist monasteries (kyaung).

Landmarks
The following landmark buildings and structures are protected by the city.

References

Townships of Yangon